Hugo Leroux (born 7 January 1992) is a French footballer who plays as a defender.

Career
After a tremendous season with the FC Miami City where hugo was named Defender of the year, Leroux signed at the beginning of April 2016 for Miami FC, having impressed during try-outs in November 2015.

Career statistics

References

1993 births
Living people
French footballers
Association football defenders
FC Miami City players
Miami FC players
USL League Two players
North American Soccer League players
French expatriate footballers
Expatriate footballers in Spain
Expatriate soccer players in the United States
French expatriate sportspeople in Spain
French expatriate sportspeople in the United States